Franck can refer to:

People 
 Franck (name)

Other 
 Franck (company), Croatian coffee and snacks company
 Franck (crater), Lunar crater named after James Franck

See also 
 Franc (disambiguation)
 Franks
 Frank (disambiguation)
 Frankie (disambiguation)
 Frankel, Frankl